This is a list of electoral divisions and wards in the ceremonial county of Kent in South East England. All changes since the re-organisation of local government following the passing of the Local Government Act 1972 are shown. The number of councillors elected for each electoral division or ward is shown in brackets.

County council

Kent
Electoral Divisions from 1 April 1974 (first election 12 April 1973) to 7 May 1981:

Electoral Divisions from 7 May 1981 to 5 May 2005:

† minor boundary changes in 1989

Electoral Divisions from 5 May 2005 to 4 May 2017:

† minor boundary changes in 2009

Electoral Divisions from 4 May 2017 to present:

Unitary authority council

Medway
Wards due from 1 May 1997 (order revoked shortly before election):

Wards from 1 April 1998 (first election 1 May 1997) to 1 May 2003:

Wards from 1 May 2003 to 2023:

Wards from 2023:

District councils

Ashford
Wards from 1 April 1974 (first election 7 June 1973) to 6 May 1976:

Wards from 6 May 1976 to 1 May 2003:

Wards from 1 May 2003 to 2 May 2019:

Wards from 2 May 2019 to present:

Canterbury
Wards from 1 April 1974 (first election 7 June 1973) to 3 May 1979:

Wards from 3 May 1979 to 1 May 2003:

Wards from 1 May 2003 to 7 May 2015:

Wards from 7 May 2015 to present:

Dartford
Wards from 1 April 1974 (first election 7 June 1973) to 6 May 1976:

Wards from 6 May 1976 to 1 May 2003:

Wards from 1 May 2003 to 2 May 2019:

Wards from 2 May 2019:

Dover
Wards from 1 April 1974 (first election 7 June 1973) to 3 May 1979:

Wards from 3 May 1979 to 1 May 2003:

Wards from 1 May 2003 to 2 May 2019:

Wards from 2 May 2019 to present:

Gravesham
Wards from 1 April 1974 (first election 7 June 1973) to 3 May 1979:

Wards from 3 May 1979 to 1 May 2003:

Wards from 1 May 2003 to present:

Maidstone
Wards from 1 April 1974 (first election 7 June 1973) to 3 May 1979:

Wards from 3 May 1979 to 2 May 2002:

Wards from 2 May 2002 to present:

† minor boundary changes in 2011

Sevenoaks
Wards from 1 April 1974 (first election 7 June 1973) to 3 May 1979:

Wards from 3 May 1979 to 1 May 2003:

† minor boundary changes in 1987

Wards from 1 May 2003 to present:

† minor boundary changes in 2015

Shepway/Folkestone and Hythe
Wards from 1 April 1974 (first election 7 June 1973) to 3 May 1979:

Wards from 3 May 1979 to 1 May 2003:

Wards from 1 May 2003 to 7 May 2015:

Wards from 7 May 2015 to present:

Swale
Wards from 1 April 1974 (first election 7 June 1973) to 3 May 1979:

Wards from 3 May 1979 to 2 May 2002:

Wards from 2 May 2002 to 7 May 2015:

Wards from 7 May 2015 to present:

Thanet
Wards from 1 April 1974 (first election 7 June 1973) to 3 May 1979:

Wards from 3 May 1979 to 1 May 2003:

Wards from 1 May 2003 to present:

Tonbridge and Malling
Wards from 1 April 1974 (first election 7 June 1973) to 3 May 1979:

Wards from 3 May 1979 to 2 May 1991:

Wards from 2 May 1991 to 1 May 2003:

Wards from 1 May 2003 to 7 May 2015:

Wards from 7 May 2015 to present:

Tunbridge Wells
Wards from 1 April 1974 (first election 7 June 1973) to 6 May 1976:

Wards from 6 May 1976 to 2 May 2002:

Wards from 2 May 2002 to present:

Former district councils

Gillingham
Wards from 1 April 1974 (first election 7 June 1973) to 3 May 1979:

Wards from 3 May 1979 to 1 April 1998 (district abolished):

Rochester-upon-Medway
Wards from 1 April 1974 (first election 7 June 1973) to 3 May 1979:

Wards from 3 May 1979 to 1 April 1998 (district abolished):

Electoral wards by constituency

Ashford
Aylesford Green, Beaver, Biddenden, Bockhanger, Boughton Aluph and Eastwell, Bybrook, Charing, Downs North, Downs West, Godinton, Great Chart with Singleton North, Highfield, Isle of Oxney, Kennington, Little Burton Farm, Norman, North Willesborough, Park Farm North, Park Farm South, Rolvenden and Tenterden West, St Michaels, Singleton South, South Willesborough, Stanhope, Stour, Tenterden North, Tenterden South, Victoria, Washford, Weald Central, Weald East, Weald North, Weald South, Wye.

Canterbury
Barham Downs, Barton, Blean Forest, Chartham and Stone Street, Chestfield and Swalecliffe, Gorrell, Harbledown, Harbour, Little Stour, North Nailbourne, Northgate, St Stephens, Seasalter, Sturry North, Sturry South, Tankerton, Westgate, Wincheap.

Chatham and Aylesford
Aylesford, Blue Bell Hill and Walderslade, Burham, Chatham Central, Eccles and Wouldham, Ditton, Larkfield North, Larkfield South, Lordswood and Capstone, Luton and Wayfield, Princes Park, Snodland East, Snodland West, Walderslade.

Dartford
Bean and Darenth, Brent, Castle, Greenhithe, Hartley and Hodsoll Street, Heath, Joyce Green, Joydens Wood, Littlebrook, Longfield, New Barn and Southfleet, Newtown, Princes, Stone, Sutton-at-Hone and Hawley, Swanscombe, Town, West Hill, Wilmington.

Dover
Aylesham, Buckland, Capel-le-Ferne, Castle, Eastry, Eythorne and Shepherdswell, Lydden and Temple Ewell, Maxton, Elms Vale and Priory, Middle Deal and Sholden, Mill Hill, North Deal, Ringwould, River, St Margaret's-at-Cliffe, St Radigunds, Tower Hamlets, Town and Pier, Walmer, Whitfield.

Faversham and Mid Kent
Abbey, Bearsted, Boughton, Monchelsea and Chart Sutton, Boxley, Courtenay, Davington Priory, Detling and Thurnham, Downswood and Otham, East Downs, Harrietsham and Lenham, Headcorn, Leeds, North Downs, Park Wood, Shepway North, Shepway South, St Ann's, Sutton Valence and Langley, Watling.

Folkestone and Hythe
Dymchurch and St Mary's Bay, Elham and Stelling Minnis, Folkestone Cheriton, Folkestone East, Folkestone Foord, Folkestone Harbour, Folkestone Harvey Central, Folkestone Harvey West, Folkestone Morehall, Folkestone Park, Folkestone Sandgate, Hythe Central, Hythe East, Hythe West, Lydd, Lympne and Stanford, New Romney Coast, New Romney Town, North Downs East, North Downs West, Romney Marsh, Saxon Shore, Tolsford.

Gillingham and Rainham
Gillingham North, Gillingham South, Hempstead and Wigmore, Rainham Central, Rainham North, Rainham South, Twydall, Watling.

Gravesham
Central, Chalk, Coldharbour, Higham, Istead Rise, Meopham North, Meopham South and Vigo, Northfleet North, Northfleet South, Painters Ash, Pelham, Riverside, Riverview, Shorne, Cobham and Luddesdown, Singlewell, Westcourt, Whitehill, Woodlands.

Maidstone and The Weald
Allington, Barming, Benenden and Cranbrook, Bridge, Coxheath and Hunton, East, Fant, Frittenden and Sissinghurst, Heath, High Street, Loose, Marden and Yalding, North, South, Staplehurst.

North Thanet
Birchington North, Birchington South, Dane Valley, Garlinge, Greenhill and Eddington, Herne and Broomfield, Heron, Margate Central, Marshside, Reculver, Salmestone, Thanet Villages, West Bay, Westbrook, Westgate-on-Sea.

Rochester and Strood
Cuxton and Halling, Peninsula, River, Rochester East, Rochester South and Horsted, Rochester West, Strood North, Strood Rural, Strood South.

Sevenoaks
Ash, Brasted, Chevening and Sundridge, Crockenhill and Well Hill, Dunton Green and Riverhead, Eynsford, Farningham, Horton Kirby and South Darenth, Fawkham and West Kingsdown, Halstead, Knockholt and Badgers Mount, Hextable, Kemsing, Otford and Shoreham, Seal and Weald, Sevenoaks Eastern, Sevenoaks Kippington, Sevenoaks Northern, Sevenoaks Town and St John's, Swanley Christchurch and Swanley Village, Swanley St Mary's, Swanley White Oak, Westerham and Crockham Hill.

Sittingbourne and Sheppey
Borden, Chalkwell, Grove, Hartlip, Newington and Upchurch, Iwade and Lower Halstow, Kemsley, Leysdown and Warden, Milton Regis, Minster Cliffs, Murston, Queenborough and Halfway, Roman, St Michaels, Sheerness East, Sheerness West, Sheppey Central, Teynham and Lynsted, West Downs, Woodstock.

South Thanet
Beacon Road, Bradstowe, Central Harbour, Cliffsend and Pegwell, Cliftonville East, Cliftonville West, Eastcliff, Kingsgate, Little Stour and Ashstone, Nethercourt, Newington, Northwood, Sandwich, St Peters, Sir Moses Montefiore, Viking.

Tonbridge and Malling
Borough Green and Long Mill, Cage Green, Castle, Cowden and Hever, Downs, East Malling, East Peckham and Golden Green, Edenbridge North and East, Edenbridge South and West, Hadlow, Leigh and Chiddingstone Causeway, Mereworth and West Peckham, Higham, Hildenborough, Ightham, Judd, Kings Hill, Medway, Trench, Vauxhall, Wateringbury, West Malling and Leybourne, Wrotham.

Tunbridge Wells
Brenchley and Horsmonden, Broadwater, Capel, Culverden, Goudhurst and Lamberhurst, Hawkhurst and Sandhurst, Paddock Wood East, Paddock Wood West, Pantiles and St Mark's, Park, Pembury, Rusthall, St James’, St John's, Sherwood, Southborough and High Brooms, Southborough North, Speldhurst and Bidborough.

See also
List of parliamentary constituencies in Kent

References

 
Kent